Wandsbek-Gartenstadt is a major rapid transit station on the Hamburg U-Bahn lines U1 and U3. For line U1, Wandsbek-Gartenstadt is a through station; for line U3, it is terminus station. The station is located in the Gartenstadt (garden city) of Wandsbek, Germany. Wandsbek is center of the Hamburg borough of Wandsbek.

History 
The station was opened in 1918 by the name "Hinschenfelde" and as part of Hamburg's Walddörferbahn. In 1920 the station was electrified, renamed "Wandsbek-Gartenstadt" and integrated into the Hamburger Hochbahn network. On 4 August 1963 the second rail line was opened.

Since 2014, ongoing modernization works on the station building and the station platforms are underway, including raised platforms for handicap-accessibility and new platform roofs. Since May 2014, the northbound trains are accessible via an elevator, the southbound trains are expected to be equipped accordingly by the end of 2014.

Layout 
The station is located on the northern side of Ostpreußenplatz, a small square off Lesserstraße. The two elevated island platforms sit on a rail dam, with main access from a small station building on the southern side, and a pedestrian tunnel on the north side. The station allows for cross-platform interchange between the two lines.

Service

Trains 
Wandsbek-Gartenstadt U-Bahn station is served by Hamburg U-Bahn lines U1 and U3.

Gallery

See also 

 List of Hamburg U-Bahn stations

References

External links 

 Line and route network plans at hvv.de 
 100 Jahre Hochbahn at hochbahn.de 

Hamburg U-Bahn stations in Hamburg
Buildings and structures in Wandsbek
U1 (Hamburg U-Bahn) stations
U3 (Hamburg U-Bahn) stations
Railway stations in Germany opened in 1918